Taman Perindustrian Puchong LRT station (abbreviate as TPP LRT Station) is a Light Rapid Transit station at Puchong Industrial Park, in Puchong, Selangor, Malaysia. It is part of the Sri Petaling Line, which is situated between Bandar Puteri station and Pusat Bandar Puchong station. Like most other LRT stations operating in Klang Valley, this station is elevated.

The station is situated beside Rakan Muda Complex, with 1M4U sentral situated in it. A pedestrian bridge over Damansara-Puchong Expressway connects the station to the shopping area in Bandar Puteri Puchong.

This station probably holds the distinction for having the longest station name with 25 character among all rapid transit stations in the Kuala Lumpur rapid transit network.

History 

The extension of Sri Petaling Line was announced on 29 August 2006 by then Malaysian Deputy Prime Minister Mohd Najib Abdul Razak. Then Prime Minister of Malaysia Tun Abdullah Badawi also confirm that the government was considering and researching the possibilities of the extension in his National Budget speech in 2006. The station was originally planned to be built near the Puchong Fire and Rescue Station on the east side of LDP, however the current side was approved by the municipal in 2009.

The extension project, worth RM955.84 million, was awarded to a joint venture (JV) consortium of George Kent (M) Bhd and its partner Lion Pacific Sdn Bhd. Construction started in 2010. However, construction was halted when SJK (T) Castlefield, a tamil school which is in the way of the project, refused to be reallocate to the proposed site. The proposed site had caused disputes when another school, SJK (C) Kheng Cheng, was also planned to be built on the same site. After some negotiation and interference of the local MPs, the school remains at its original site with the elevated railway using just 0.7 acres of school ground.

Fault free test runs of the trains started on 22 January 2016. Although it faced some delays, the station was opened on 31 March 2016, as a part of the second phase of the extension.

Station

Station Layout 
Park-and-ride facilities are provided in the station with 347 parking bays built next to the station. Two convenience store, operated by Mynews.com and 7-Eleven, can be found in the station. Like all LRT station in Klang Valley, the station provides disabled-friendly facilities such as accessibility lifts, accessible toilets, special gate entrance for wheelchair users and tactile paving provided throughout the station. The trains and station platforms are level with one another, with a minimal gap between the two. This allows for easy boarding with a wheelchair.

Infrastructure 
As part of a green initiative launched by Prasarana, the station includes green practices. Energy-efficient lights and rainwater harvesting systems were installed in every station. Windows were designed to allow sunlight into the stations. Construction utilized sustainable materials and recycling practices.

Entrances and Exits
Taman Perindustrian Puchong LRT station has a total of two entrances/exits, one heading towards the industrial area and the Park N' Ride facilities, while another leads to the shopping district of Bandar Puteri.

Bus services

Feeder bus

Other buses

Gallery

Notes

References

External links 
Taman Perindustrian Puchong LRT Station - KL MRT Line Integrations

Ampang Line
Railway stations opened in 2016